The discography of American rapper ASAP Rocky consists of three studio albums, one mixtape, 42 singles (including 25 as a featured artist), eight promotional singles and 31 music videos.

Throughout his career, he has released his projects through his own label, AWGE, as well as Polo Grounds Music and RCA Records, a division of Sony Music Entertainment.

Albums

Studio albums

Mixtapes

Singles

As lead artist

As featured artist

Promotional singles

Other charted songs

Guest appearances

Music videos

See also
ASAP Mob discography

Notes

References

External links
 Official website
 ASAP Rocky at AllMusic
 
 

Discographies of American artists
Hip hop discographies